Fernando Cerrada (born 21 August 1954) is a Spanish former long-distance runner who competed in the 1976 Summer Olympics.

References

External links
 

1954 births
Living people
Spanish male long-distance runners
Olympic athletes of Spain
Athletes (track and field) at the 1976 Summer Olympics
Mediterranean Games gold medalists for Spain
Mediterranean Games medalists in athletics
Athletes (track and field) at the 1975 Mediterranean Games